Tapscott is a surname. Notable people with the surname include:

Derek Tapscott (1932–2008), Welsh former professional footballer and Wales international
Don Tapscott (born 1947), Canadian business executive, author, consultant and speaker
Ed Tapscott, the former interim head coach of the NBA's Washington Wizards
George Tapscott (born 1889), South African cricketer who played in one Test in 1913
Horace Tapscott (born 1934), American jazz pianist and composer
John E. Tapscott (1930–2017), American businessman and politician
Lionel Tapscott (born 1894), South African cricketer who played in 2 Tests in 1923
Luke Tapscott (born 1991), Australian rules footballer for the Melbourne Football Club

See also
Tapscott, Virginia, unincorporated community in Albemarle County, Virginia
Tup Scott